Ernst Theodor Karl Schwalbe (26 January 1871 – 16 March 1920) was a German pathologist, who specialized in teratological research.

Schwalbe was born in Berlin. He studied medicine at the universities of Strassburg, Berlin and Heidelberg, and received his habilitation in 1900 with a thesis on blood coagulation. Afterwards, he worked as an assistant under Julius Arnold at Heidelberg, and in 1907/08 served as prosector and head of the pathology-bacteriology clinic at the city hospital in Karlsruhe. From 1908 to 1920 he was a full professor at the University of Rostock. He was killed in Rostock while serving as a volunteer during the Kapp Putsch (1920).

Selected works 
 Untersuchungen zur Blutgerinnung : Beiträge zur Chemie und Morphologie der Coagulation des Blutes, 1900 – Studies on blood coagulation: Contributions to the chemistry and morphology of coagulation of the blood.
 Vorlesungen über der Geschichte der Medizin, 1905 – Lectures on the history of medicine. 
 Die Morphologie der Missbildungen des Menschen und der Tiere (3 volumes 1906–13) – Morphology of malformations of humans and animals:
 I.   Allgemeine Missbildungslehre (Teratologie) – General teratology. 
 II.  Die Doppelbildungen – Double formations.
 III. Die Einzelmissbildungen – Single malformations.
 Untersuchungen über künstliche Parthenogenese und das Wesen des Befruchtungsvorgangs, 1906 – Studies on artificial parthenogenesis and the nature of the fertilization process.
 Kleinlebewesen und Krankheiten; sechs volkswissenschaftliche Vorträge über Bakteriologie und Hygiene, 1908 – Microbes and diseases: Six scientific lectures on bacteriology and hygiene. 
 Studien zur Pathologie der Entwicklung (with Robert Meyer; 2 volumes 1914–20) – Studies on the pathology of development.

References 

1871 births
1920 deaths
Scientists from Berlin
Academic staff of Heidelberg University
Academic staff of the University of Rostock
German pathologists
Teratologists